In set theory, an honest leftmost branch of a tree T on ω × γ is a branch (maximal chain) ƒ ∈ [T] such that for each branch g ∈ [T], one has ∀ n ∈ ω : ƒ(n) ≤ g(n). Here, [T] denotes the set of branches of maximal length of T, ω is the smallest infinite ordinal (represented by the natural numbers N), and γ is some other ordinal.

See also
 scale (computing)
 Suslin set

References
 Akihiro Kanamori, The Higher Infinite, Perspectives in Mathematical Logic, Springer, Berlin, 1997.
 Yiannis N. Moschovakis, Descriptive set theory, North-Holland, Amsterdam, 1980.

Trees (set theory)